Croaker is an unincorporated community in James City County, Virginia, United States on the south bank of the York River 10 miles downstream from West Point. The York River is formed from the confluence of the Mattaponi River and the Pamunkey River at West Point. The York River empties into the Chesapeake Bay about 30 miles downstream from Croaker.

The name "Croaker" is believed to have derived from the abundant quantity of Atlantic croaker (Micropogonias undulatus), an inshore, bottom-dwelling fish found in the Chesapeake Bay at the mouth of the York River.

The town of Croaker was known in its early history as Taskinas Plantation, then Hollywood (due to the many holly trees). "Taskinask" was designated by the Tobacco Inspection Act of 1730 as the site public tobacco warehouse where local planters stored their crops to be shipped to England.

Croaker had several stores, two schools, a church, and several houses by the early 20th century.  Some of the shopkeepers who established a presence before 1950 were members of the Garrett family.  Garrett's Grocery opened in 1909 and was run by five generations of the family until its closing on December 31, 2013.  Croaker General Store took over the building and opened up on May 25, 2015.

In February, 2006, the historic Norge railroad station (circa 1908) of the Peninsula Extension of the Chesapeake and Ohio Railway (C&O) was relocated about 1 mile to a site adjacent to the James City County Branch of the Williamsburg Regional Library (opened in 1996) on Croaker Road. The following month, work was underway to set a new foundation for the building.

York River State Park, opened in 1980, is located at Croaker.  In the state park, the historical Croaker Landing is an archaeological site listed in the National Register of Historic Places since 1987.

While much of Croaker is now within York River State Park, the remaining area is divided among residential, farming, and woodland area. Interstate 64 skirts the edge of the community, and it is accessed from Exit 231, which is signed "Croaker-Norge." The old Richmond-Williamsburg Stage Road, now U.S. Route 60, also is nearby. There is also a farm where the busts of former presidents all the way up to George W. Bush are located. However they are in a moderate state of disrepair. Said busts are from an old tourist attraction called Presidents Park, which went bankrupt in 2010.

Further reading
Bradshaw, Nancy Smith and Frances Huckstep Hamilton. (1989) Velkommen til Norge: A Pictorial History of Norge, Virginia

References

External links
 Geographical coordinates:  (click for maps and satellite photos of Croaker, Virginia)
James City County (official website)
Williamsburg-James City County Public Schools
Williamsburg Regional Library
York River State Park

Unincorporated communities in James City County, Virginia
Unincorporated communities in Virginia